KV31 is a tomb located in the Valley of the Kings, near Luxor, Egypt. Only the top of the shaft was known prior to excavation by the University of Basel Kings' Valley Project in 2010, and no earlier excavations are known, although it is suggested that the stone anthropoid sarcophagus excavated by Giovanni Battista Belzoni may have originated from this tomb. The tomb was found to be filled with mixed debris of pottery sherds and linen fragments, as well as the remains of five mummified individuals dating to the Eighteenth Dynasty.

Excavation and layout
In January 2010 the University of Basel Kings' Valley Project began their excavation of the tomb, of which only the upper portion of the shaft was known. The shaft proved to be well-cut and descends  through both accumulated conglomerate and bedrock; the fill within the shaft contained modern rubbish above limestone chips, sand, and rocky debris. Three pots containing Nile mud used for sealing the door of the tomb were found at the bottom of the shaft. The shaft opens onto a main chamber with two adjoining rooms, which were found filled throughout with debris to a depth of at least . 

The majority of the tomb is cut from good quality limestone bedrock; the first chamber is partly cut from bedrock and partly from conglomerate. It was immediately apparent that the tomb was thoroughly robbed in the past, as pieces of broken funerary items were scattered around. The remains of several mummies and their wrappings were found within the side chambers. A metal door was installed over the shaft at the conclusion of the excavation to protect the tomb and prevent water and debris from re-entering. The tomb was mapped in the 2010 and 2011 seasons.

Contents
The fill in all the rooms was found to contain the same mix of broken pottery, from white-washed and decorated jars, wooden fragments from coffins, large quantities of linen bandages and natron bags and other textiles, and the unwrapped remains of mummies. Also found were fragments from two canopic jars, one of calcite and one of limestone; the latter was inscribed but the space for the owner's name was blank. A piece of a dummy jar inscribed for Sennefer was also encountered. Organic materials, including wood and fabric were found to be in excellent condition. Later finds in the tomb include ostraca, a piece of linen embroidered with the cartouche of Ramesses III, and an ushabti from the Twentieth Dynasty.

Mummies
Within the two side chambers were found five mummies: two women and three men, all between the ages of 18 and 30. As there are no names with the mummies, each was given a designation based upon the room in which they were found (room C or room D).

Mummy C1 is female, and 18–25 years old at death based on the degree of epiphysial fusion and the unworn nature of her teeth. Short silky black hair remains on her head. The ears have been plugged with linen. Her organs were removed through an incision and the torso filled with dense packing; her brain does not appear to have been removed. The body was damaged by ancient robbers, with her face smashed and her head, right hand, and left foot disarticulated; the limbs are fractured and several fingers and toes are missing. Robbers evidentially cut through the bandages with a sharp blade, as cut marks are seen on the head and on the back of the shoulders. The front wall of the torso was also removed and cut marks are seen on the torso stuffing.

Mummy C2 is likely to be a young male aged 20–25 years based on the fusion of the epiphyses and the slightly worn teeth. The front half of the head is covered with layers of linen bandages but they are missing on the back of the head, revealing braided hair. The ears may have been plugged; the brain appears not to have been removed. The organs have been removed and the torso is stuffed with rolls of resin-soaked linen. This body retains much of its bandaging, with the arms and legs preserving at least a dozen layers of fabric. The body is separated into several pieces, with the head and pelvis with the legs being separated from the torso and arms. Cut marks left by robbers are visible in the bandage layers of the face and thighs; a portion of the front wall of the torso has been removed. The body exhibits several post-mortem fractures and parts of both hands and parts of the left foot are missing.

Mummy C3 is likely to be male. His headless body was found with his arms crossed over his chest, with the fingers of the left hand clenched, in the manner of a king. The torso is stuffed with a dense substance. Thick bandaging is preserved on the right leg from mid thigh to mid calf. Both feet are missing, as is the right hand; the limbs show multiple fractures and dislocations.

Mummy C4 is the largely intact body of an individual who is possibly male although no genitalia are seen. His hair is short save for longer strands on the right side, suggesting the side-lock of youth. The teeth are a little worn but the wisdom teeth have not erupted; the bottom jaw is completely missing. The left arm is broken but present while the right arm is entirely missing. The legs are dislocated at the knee and feet. The embalming incision may be vertical, which possibly dates the mummy to before the reign of Thutmose III. Cut marks left by robbers are seen on the back of the hip.

Mummy D4 is the highly fragmented body of an adult aged 20–30 years. The individual is possibly female, although this is uncertain. Only the skull, parts of the spine, shoulder blades, sternum, right upper arm, one leg and part of the pelvis remain. The grouping is based on the fact the leg and pelvis portions match, and the presence of a spare head. A living height of  based on limb measurements is estimated for a male individual. The brain was not removed. The hair on the head is short and reddish, possibly due to bleaching during embalming. A part of the genitals (possibly male) may be preserved on the left side although ancient damage complicates this. The leg belonged to an individual who was likely fat in life, as the skin is folded over in places.

The unwrapping and scattering of the bodies was likely the work of tomb robbers, both ancient and modern. The mummies were likely unwrapped during the Third Intermediate Period, while the removal of heads and hands is attributed to more modern robbers looking for pieces to sell to early tourists. The report suggests that given the large quantity of pottery recovered from the tomb, these mummies were all originally interred together. The style of mummification seen in the individuals conforms to that seen in the elites of the mid-Eighteenth Dynasty.

References

External links
Theban Mapping Project: KV31 includes detailed maps of most of the tombs.
University of Basel Kings' Valley Project excavation season summaries.

1817 archaeological discoveries
Valley of the Kings